The Basketball Bundesliga Best Offensive Player (German: Bester Offensivspieler) is an annual Basketball Bundesliga (BBL) award that has been given since the 2003–04 season, to the league's best offensive player. The inaugural winner of the award was BJ McKie of TBB Trier. Julius Jenkins holds the record of most awards won, with three.

Winners

References

External links
German League official website 

Basketball Bundesliga awards